Robert Emmets GAC (Irish: CLG Roibéard Eiméad ) are a Gaelic Athletic Association club located in Perrystown, Dublin, Ireland.

Competitions

Their two adult men's football teams play Adult Junior football in AFL Division 7 and AFL Division 11B and Parsons Cup (B) and Mooney Cup (A), respectively.

Division 4 u12 league 2015
Division 4 u14 feile semi final

Roll of Honour
 Dublin AFL Division 11S Winner 2010
 Dublin Ladies' Senior Football Championship Winners 1991, 1994

Leadership
Chairperson: Rhoda Kerins

Secretary: Tony Byrne

Treasurer: Darren Darcy

Juvenile Chairperson: Siobhan Malone

Ladies Chairperson: Siobhan Allen

They hold home fixtures at the "Eight Acres", Greentrees Park D12.

History
Robert Emmets GAC was founded by Michael Clancy (Co. Clare) and Billy Quinn (Co. Tipperary), amongst others, in Perrystown.

References
http://www.robertemmetsclg.com/

Gaelic games clubs in Dublin (city)